This is a list of butterflies of Burkina Faso. About 156 species are known from Burkina Faso, none of which are endemic.

Papilionidae

Papilioninae

Papilionini
Papilio nireus Linnaeus, 1758
Papilio dardanus Brown, 1776
Papilio demodocus Esper, [1798]
Papilio horribilis Butler, 1874

Leptocercini
Graphium angolanus baronis (Ungemach, 1932)
Graphium leonidas (Fabricius, 1793)
Graphium adamastor (Boisduval, 1836)

Pieridae

Coliadinae
Eurema brigitta (Stoll, [1780])
Catopsilia florella (Fabricius, 1775)

Pierinae
Colotis antevippe (Boisduval, 1836)
Colotis aurora evarne (Klug, 1829)
Colotis celimene sudanicus (Aurivillius, 1905)
Colotis chrysonome (Klug, 1829)
Colotis danae eupompe (Klug, 1829)
Colotis euippe (Linnaeus, 1758)
Colotis evagore antigone (Boisduval, 1836)
Colotis vesta amelia (Lucas, 1852)
Pinacopterix eriphia tritogenia (Klug, 1829)

Pierini
Appias epaphia (Cramer, [1779])
Mylothris chloris (Fabricius, 1775)
Dixeia doxo (Godart, 1819)
Dixeia orbona (Geyer, [1837])
Belenois aurota (Fabricius, 1793)
Belenois calypso (Drury, 1773)
Belenois creona (Cramer, [1776])
Belenois gidica (Godart, 1819)
Belenois subeida (Felder & Felder, 1865)

Lycaenidae

Miletinae

Miletini
Lachnocnema vuattouxi Libert, 1996

Aphnaeinae
Cigaritis avriko (Karsch, 1893)
Cigaritis nilus (Hewitson, 1865)
Zeritis neriene Boisduval, 1836
Axiocerses amanga borealis Aurivillius, 1905
Aphnaeus brahami Lathy, 1903

Theclinae
Myrina subornata Lathy, 1903
Dapidodigma hymen (Fabricius, 1775)
Hypolycaena anara Larsen, 1986
Hypolycaena philippus (Fabricius, 1793)
Iolaus alienus bicaudatus Aurivillius, 1905
Iolaus scintillans Aurivillius, 1905
Iolaus sudanicus Aurivillius, 1905
Iolaus menas Druce, 1890
Iolaus ismenias (Klug, 1834)
Iolaus calisto (Westwood, 1851)
Stugeta marmoreus (Butler, 1866)
Pilodeudorix caerulea (Druce, 1890)
Deudorix antalus (Hopffer, 1855)
Deudorix dinochares Grose-Smith, 1887
Deudorix livia (Klug, 1834)
Deudorix lorisona (Hewitson, 1862)

Polyommatinae

Lycaenesthini
Anthene amarah (Guérin-Méneville, 1849)
Anthene crawshayi (Butler, 1899)
Anthene larydas (Cramer, 1780)
Anthene lunulata (Trimen, 1894)
Anthene princeps (Butler, 1876)
Anthene starki Larsen, 2005
Anthene sylvanus (Drury, 1773)
Anthene marshalli (Bethune-Baker, 1903)
Anthene nigeriae (Aurivillius, 1905)
Anthene phoenicis (Karsch, 1893)

Polyommatini
Cupidopsis cissus (Godart, [1824])
Pseudonacaduba sichela (Wallengren, 1857)
Lampides boeticus (Linnaeus, 1767)
Cacyreus lingeus (Stoll, 1782)
Leptotes brevidentatus (Tite, 1958)
Leptotes jeanneli (Stempffer, 1935)
Leptotes pirithous (Linnaeus, 1767)
Tuxentius cretosus nodieri (Oberthür, 1883)
Tarucus kiki Larsen, 1976
Tarucus legrasi Stempffer, 1948
Tarucus rosacea (Austaut, 1885)
Tarucus theophrastus (Fabricius, 1793)
Tarucus ungemachi Stempffer, 1942
Zizeeria knysna (Trimen, 1862)
Zizina antanossa (Mabille, 1877)
Zizula hylax (Fabricius, 1775)
Azanus jesous (Guérin-Méneville, 1849)
Azanus mirza (Plötz, 1880)
Azanus ubaldus (Stoll, 1782)
Euchrysops malathana (Boisduval, 1833)
Euchrysops nilotica (Aurivillius, 1904)
Euchrysops osiris (Hopffer, 1855)
Euchrysops reducta Hulstaert, 1924
Euchrysops sahelianus Libert, 2001
Chilades eleusis (Demaison, 1888)
Freyeria trochylus (Freyer, [1843])
Lepidochrysops parsimon (Fabricius, 1775)
Lepidochrysops victoriae occidentalis Libert & Collins, 2001

Nymphalidae

Danainae

Danaini
Danaus chrysippus alcippus (Cramer, 1777)
Tirumala petiverana (Doubleday, 1847)
Amauris tartarea Mabille, 1876
Amauris damocles (Fabricius, 1793)

Satyrinae

Melanitini
Melanitis leda (Linnaeus, 1758)

Satyrini
Bicyclus milyas (Hewitson, 1864)
Bicyclus pavonis (Butler, 1876)
Bicyclus sandace (Hewitson, 1877)
Bicyclus vulgaris (Butler, 1868)
Ypthima asterope (Klug, 1832)
Ypthima condamini nigeriae Kielland, 1982
Ypthimomorpha itonia (Hewitson, 1865)

Charaxinae

Charaxini
Charaxes varanes vologeses (Mabille, 1876)
Charaxes boueti Feisthamel, 1850
Charaxes jasius Poulton, 1926
Charaxes epijasius Reiche, 1850
Charaxes legeri Plantrou, 1978
Charaxes castor (Cramer, 1775)
Charaxes tiridates (Cramer, 1777)
Charaxes virilis van Someren & Jackson, 1952
Charaxes viola Butler, 1866
Charaxes northcotti Rothschild, 1899

Nymphalinae

Nymphalini
Vanessa cardui (Linnaeus, 1758)
Junonia chorimene (Guérin-Méneville, 1844)
Junonia hierta cebrene Trimen, 1870
Junonia oenone (Linnaeus, 1758)
Junonia orithya madagascariensis Guenée, 1865
Junonia sophia (Fabricius, 1793)
Junonia terea (Drury, 1773)
Precis ceryne ceruana Rothschild & Jordan, 190
Precis octavia (Cramer, 1777)
Precis pelarga (Fabricius, 1775)
Hypolimnas misippus (Linnaeus, 1764)
Catacroptera cloanthe ligata Rothschild & Jordan, 1903

Biblidinae

Biblidini
Byblia anvatara crameri Aurivillius, 1894
Byblia ilithyia (Drury, 1773)

Epicaliini
Sevenia umbrina (Karsch, 1892)

Limenitinae

Neptidini
Neptis kiriakoffi Overlaet, 1955
Neptis nemetes Hewitson, 1868

Adoliadini
Hamanumida daedalus (Fabricius, 1775)
Euphaedra laguerrei Hecq, 1979

Heliconiinae

Acraeini
Acraea camaena (Drury, 1773)
Acraea neobule Doubleday, 1847
Acraea quirina (Fabricius, 1781)
Acraea zetes (Linnaeus, 1758)
Acraea egina (Cramer, 1775)
Acraea caecilia (Fabricius, 1781)
Acraea pseudegina Westwood, 1852
Acraea vestalis Felder & Felder, 1865
Acraea encedana Pierre, 1976
Acraea encedon (Linnaeus, 1758)
Acraea serena (Fabricius, 1775)

Vagrantini
Phalanta phalantha aethiopica (Rothschild & Jordan, 1903)

Hesperiidae

Coeliadinae
Coeliades aeschylus (Plötz, 1884)
Coeliades forestan (Stoll, [1782])
Coeliades pisistratus (Fabricius, 1793)

Pyrginae

Tagiadini
Tagiades flesus (Fabricius, 1781)
Caprona adelica Karsch, 1892
Abantis nigeriana Butler, 1901

Carcharodini
Spialia dromus (Plötz, 1884)
Spialia spio (Linnaeus, 1764)
Gomalia elma (Trimen, 1862)

Hesperiinae

Aeromachini
Prosopalpus styla Evans, 1937
Pardaleodes incerta murcia (Plötz, 1883)
Platylesches moritili (Wallengren, 1857)

Baorini
Pelopidas mathias (Fabricius, 1798)
Borbo gemella (Mabille, 1884)
Parnara monasi (Trimen & Bowker, 1889)
Gegenes hottentota (Latreille, 1824)
Gegenes pumilio gambica (Mabille, 1878)

See also
Geography of Burkina Faso
Guinean forest-savanna mosaic

References

Seitz, A. Die Gross-Schmetterlinge der Erde 13: Die Afrikanischen Tagfalter. Plates 
Seitz, A. Die Gross-Schmetterlinge der Erde 13: Die Afrikanischen Tagfalter. Text (in German)

Burk
Burkina Faso
Burkina Faso
Burkina Faso
Butterflies